Rosa Carolina Mejía Gómez (born 28 March 1969) is a Dominican politician, economist, and businesswoman. She is the current mayor of Distrito Nacional, the first woman to assume the position.

Early life
Rosa Carolina Mejía Gómez  was born in Santiago de los Caballeros on 28 March 1969 to Hipólito Mejía, agronomist and President of the Dominican Republic from 2000 to 2004, and Rosa Gómez Arias, the former First Lady of the Dominican Republic. Carolina has 2 brothers and 1 sister.

Personal life
She is married to Juan Antonio Garrigó Lefeld, insurance and brokerage businessman of Catalan and German descent; they have 3 children: Juan de Jesús, Diego José, and Isabel Carolina Garrigó Mejía.

Political life
In the early 2000s she was member of the Central Bank of the Dominican Republic’s Board. In 2016 she became the vice presidential candidate of the Modern Revolutionary Party.

Mejía de Garrigó was elected General Secretary of her party in the primary elections held on 18 March 2018, she took office on 14 June 2018.

On 24 April 2020 Mejía took office as mayor of Santo Domingo, becoming the first woman to ever lead the Dominican Republic capital city.

References

1969 births
Dominican Republic economists
Modern Revolutionary Party politicians
Living people
21st-century Dominican Republic women politicians
21st-century Dominican Republic politicians
Dominican Republic people of Canarian descent
Dominican Republic people of Catalan descent
People from Santiago de los Caballeros
White Dominicans
Women mayors of places in the Dominican Republic
Dominican Republic Roman Catholics
Children of national leaders